Lincoln Zvasiya (born 25 February 1991) is a Zimbabwean professional footballer, who plays as a defender for CAPS United and the Zimbabwe national team.

Career

Club
Born in Harare, Zvasiya began his career with the Aces Youth Soccer Academy. After leaving Aces Youth he joined his first senior club when he signed for 2008 Zimbabwe Premier Soccer League winners Monomotapa United. After a year with Monomotapa, Zvasiya had a short stint with Platinum before leaving them in the middle of 2013 to join South African club Kaizer Chiefs.

With Kaizer Chiefs he won the 2012–13 Premier Soccer League and the 2012–13 Nedbank Cup before departing on loan to join Greek side OFI Crete in July 2013. He returned to Kaizer Chiefs in December 2013 but was released nine months later. After spending September to December 2014 without a club, Zvasiya agreed to join Harare City in 2015 but was released a few months later. In 2016, Zvasiya joined ZPC Kariba.

International
Zvasiya has won six caps and scored one goal for the Zimbabwe national team, with his debut coming in a friendly against Zambia in 2011. Three more appearances went past before he scored his first goal for his nation in a 2014 FIFA World Cup qualifying defeat to Egypt.

In October 2012, Zvasiya was cleared of match fixing charges that came about from Asiagate.

Career statistics

International
.

International goals
. Scores and results list Zimbabwe's goal tally first.

Honours

Club
Kaizer Chiefs
Premier Soccer League (1): 2012–13
Nedbank Cup (1): 2012–13

References

External links

1991 births
Living people
Zimbabwean footballers
Zimbabwe international footballers
Association football defenders
Monomotapa United F.C. players
F.C. Platinum players
Kaizer Chiefs F.C. players
OFI Crete F.C. players
Harare City F.C. players
Dynamos F.C. players
CAPS United players
Super League Greece players
Zimbabwean expatriate footballers
Expatriate soccer players in South Africa
Zimbabwean expatriate sportspeople in South Africa
Expatriate footballers in Greece
Zimbabwean expatriate sportspeople in Greece
Sportspeople from Harare
ZPC Kariba F.C. players
Yadah Stars F.C. players